The Ouse Valley Railway was to have been part of the London, Brighton & South Coast Railway (LBSCR). It never opened to traffic.

Background

In the 1860s, the South Eastern Railway and the London, Chatham and Dover Railway were proposing to build railways to Brighton and Eastbourne. It accepted that the line would not be profitable but it wanted to keep other companies out of its territory. Authorisation was given to extend the line to St Leonards. One tactic to be employed by the LBSCR was to build the line as slowly as possible, delaying its opening to force other companies to look elsewhere to build their lines.

Authorisation

An Act of Parliament was needed to construct the line. This was sought in 1863 and granted - 26&27 Vict c.xxxv s.13, L.B. & S.C.R.(Ouse Valley Line) 1864. In 1864, authorisation was received to extend the line to St Leonards.

Route

The line was to leave the Brighton Main Line just south of Balcombe Viaduct and pass through Lindfield.

The line would then pass through Framfield, East Hoathly, Chiddingly and Lower Horsebridge before joining the railway at Hailsham, which was then the terminus of the line from Polegate. The line would have then continued across country to Bexhill on Sea and  St Leonards.

Construction and abandonment

Construction of the line between Haywards Heath and Uckfield began in May 1866 – the month of the collapse of Overend & Gurney's Bank, which was a major financier of railway construction projects at the time. Work stopped in February 1867 and was not resumed.

Remains

There is still much to be seen of the line between Haywards Heath and Uckfield. Skew Bridge across Borde Hill Lane between Haywards Heath and Balcombe has extended abutments where the railway would have passed over the road. Each side of the road at Borde Hill embankments survive, with a remnant of the bridge abutment on the southern side, visible from Copyhold Lane. A cutting leads to what would have been a tunnel at Kenwards Farm. In Lindfield an embankment at  survives. Near Sharp's Bridge there are the beginnings of cuttings either side of Buckham Hill where there would have been a short tunnel and south of Uckfield, an embankment and the only other completed bridge. Although reported as destroyed during the construction of the Uckfield Bypass in the 1990s, the bridge is still in position although in decrepit state, visited but not photographed September 2009. In April 2009, about a mile south-west of Uckfield there were two sections of embankments and cuttings, at ( -  ) and ( - ).

See also 
 List of never used railways

References

Further reading

External links
 A comprehensive illustrated guide to what is left to be seen on the ground.
 A video of the Ouse Valley Railway remains

Rail transport in East Sussex
Rail transport in West Sussex
Railways authorised but not built in the United Kingdom